Lake Tomahawk may refer to places in the United States:
Lake Tomahawk, Ohio, a census-designated place
Lake Tomahawk, Wisconsin, a town
Lake Tomahawk (CDP), Wisconsin, a census-designated place

See also
Tomahawk (disambiguation)